The original Much Wenlock railway station was opened 1 February 1862 by the Much Wenlock and Severn Junction Railway,  linking Buildwas with Much Wenlock. The line later formed part of the Wellington to Craven Arms Railway and was, for much of its working life, operated by the Great Western Railway. 

The original, but temporary, dead-ended station - whose buildings are now the club house of Much Wenlock Bowling Club. - was replaced by the through station illustrated - about ¼ mile (ca. 400 metres) further east - at some date between March and September 1866  (but definitely before September 1867 ).

The latter station was built at the gates of the Games Field where the Wenlock Olympian Games were held. The buildings were commented on by Pierre de Coubertin when on his visit to the 1890 games, he likened them to "a delightful cottage".

The passenger service to Craven Arms was withdrawn from 31 December 1951, but the service to Wellington continued until withdrawn from 23 July 1962.

Present day

Today the station building is a private dwelling. The section of former railway line to Buildwas is now a footpath.

References

Further reading

Railway station
Disused railway stations in Shropshire
Former Great Western Railway stations
Railway stations in Great Britain opened in 1862
Railway stations in Great Britain closed in 1962
1862 establishments in England